Augusto Pollastri (11 March 1877, in Bologna – 9 November 1927, in Bologna) was an Italian violin maker, older brother to Gaetano Pollastri.
Started his career as an apprentice in Raffaele Fiorini's studio.  Augusto's father was a miller and an amateur musician.  Augusto was exposed to music early on, he also enjoyed visiting the shop of a famous violin maker Raffaele Fiorini, where he started to perform small services in the shop, which led to an apprenticeship with maestro Fiorini.

By the age of 20, Augusto had devoted himself entirely to the activity which had inspired him (violin making), showing remarkable artistic gifts. Towards the end of Raffaele Fiorini's life, Augusto took over the workshop.
He quickly became famous as maker and restorer.

By 1927 (the year of his death), Augusto obtained official recognition in his art:
the Cross of Merit and Gold Medals at the Geneva Exhibition and the United Exhibitions of the "Littriale' in Bologna".

For thirty years Augusto Pollastri managed one of the most important luthier's Atelier in Bologna.   After the passing of Raffaele Fiorini, his brother Gaetano Pollastri joined him.

Augusto's production was of an astounding quality and class, but unfortunately not very high in numbers.

Today, Pollastri's instruments are considered legendary  and most copied in the world  aside from the Classics (Stradivari, Guarnerius etc.). 
"In fact the number of fake instruments and imitations one could come across is much greater than the number of originals. "

His students include his brother Gaetano Pollastri and Marco Dobresovitch. He collaborated with Carlo Carletti.

Bibliography

 Augusto e Gaetano Pollastri / Bologna 1877-1960 by Cesare Magrini about the Pollastri family. Cremona 1990.
 Il Suono di Bologna, Da Raffaele Fiorini ai grandi maestri del Novecento". Catalogo della Mostra nella chiesa di San Giorgio in Poggiale, Bologna 2002, 
 Eric Blot, Un secolo di Liuteria Italiana 1860-1960 - A century of Italian Violin Making - Emilia e Romagna I, Cremona 1994 and 2003, 
 Marlin Brinser, Dictionary of 20th Century Italian Violin Makers, 1978
The Strad, January 1984, Bologna - A living tradition of Violin Making

References

External links

  Pollastri violin
 Il Suono Di Bologna Details at www.florenusedizioni.com
 Nuova pagina 6 at www.artigianatoartistico.it
 ::: Alberto Giordano&C. - Fine violins, violas and cellos in Genoa ::: at www.giordanoviolins.com

Living Museum
Discover the history of the Bolognese School  Bolognese Violin Makers

'Up to the first half of the nineteenth century, Violin Making in Italy was in a standstill cycle; yet, during the second half of the century, Raffaele Fiorini :it:Fiorini Raffaele gave new impulse to it.
Thanks to him, born in Musiano di Pianoro, the luthier's ancient Art was brought back to a new life.' - History

Italian luthiers
Businesspeople from Bologna
1877 births
1927 deaths
19th-century Italian musicians